Allen Curtis (1877 – November 24, 1961), was an American film director of the silent era. He directed 278 films between 1913 and 1922. He was born in New York, New York and died in Hollywood, California.

Selected filmography
 The Tramp Dentists (1913)
 Almost an Actress (1913)
 Poor Jake's Demise (1913)

External links

1877 births
1961 deaths
American film directors